The Hunter–Lawrence–Jessup House is a historic Second Empire style house located at 58 North Broad Street in the city of Woodbury in Gloucester County, New Jersey, United States. The house was built  and was added to the National Register of Historic Places on October 18, 1972, for its significance in education, military history, and politics. The house is now known as the Gloucester County Historical Society Museum and is operated by the Gloucester County Historical Society as a museum of local history.

History and description
The house is a two and one-half story brick building constructed  by Judge John Sparks. In 1792, it was bought by Reverend Andrew Hunter and later in 1798, by John Lawrence. His brother, James Lawrence, also lived here. He is known for his last words: "Don't give up the ship!", as commander of the  during the War of 1812. After several other owners, John S. Jessup became the owner in 1871. He renovated the house in 1888 in the Second Empire style featuring a mansard roof. After his death in 1924, it was purchased by the Gloucester County Historical Society.

See also
National Register of Historic Places listings in Gloucester County, New Jersey
List of museums in New Jersey

References

Woodbury, New Jersey
Houses on the National Register of Historic Places in New Jersey
Houses completed in 1765
Brick buildings and structures
Second Empire architecture in New Jersey
Houses in Gloucester County, New Jersey
Museums in Gloucester County, New Jersey
History museums in New Jersey
National Register of Historic Places in Gloucester County, New Jersey
New Jersey Register of Historic Places
1765 establishments in New Jersey